Paolo Fusar-Poli is an Italian medical doctor, psychiatrist, and clinical academic researcher at the Institute of Psychiatry, Psychology and Neuroscience, King's College, London and at the Department of Brain and Behavioral Sciences, University of Pavia.

Early life and education
Paolo Fusar-Poli was born on July 27, 1977 in Cremona, Italy. He graduated as Medical Doctor in 2002, in Psychiatry in 2006, and obtained a Ph.D. in 2009, all from the University of Pavia.

Career and research
Dr. Fusar-Poli during his early career worked as consultant psychiatrist and junior researchers across Italy and the UK. In 2012, King's College London (KCL) awarded him a tenured position and he was granted the Specialist Associateship of the Royal College of Psychiatrists. He has also worked with the Outreach Support at South London (OASIS) at South London and Maudsley NHS Foundation Trust as a consultant psychiatrist since 2012.

As of January 2020, he is the Reader of Psychiatry and Youth Mental Health at KCL, Associate Professor at the University of Pavia, Head of the Head of Early Psychosis: Intervention and Clinical-detection (EPIC) lab, Academic Lead of the Early Psychosis Workstream of the National Institute for Health Research (NIHR) Mental Health Translational Research Collaborative, Chair of the European College of Neuropsychopharmacology Network for the Prevention of Mental Disorders and Mental Health Promotion, and Section Coordinator of the Italian Medical Society of Great Britain.

He is affiliated with the Schizophrenia Bulletin as a Review Editor and as a Section Editor for the Journal of Neurology, Psychiatry, and Brain Research. He also served as an expert advisor for the Diagnostic and Statistical Manual for Mental Disorders.

His research focuses primarily on the early detection, prediction of outcomes and prevention of severe mental disorders such as psychosis or schizophrenia. He is the author of over 330 scientific and medical publications.

Truman Syndrome
Dr. Fusar-Poli has also performed research on the Truman Syndrome, with its symptoms are found before and during the onset of severe mental disorders such as psychosis and schizophrenia. He has suggested that the "Truman explanation" is a result of the patients' search for meaning in their perception that the ordinary world has changed in some significant but inexplicable way.

Major publications
Major publications by Fusar-Poli:

Recognition
Rising Star Award by the Schizophrenia International Research Society (2012)
Highly Cited Researcher by Clarivate Analytics (2015 – 2019)

References

External links
King's College London faculty page
King's College London researcher profile
ResearchGate

Publications on Scinapse
Publications on Neurotree

Living people
1977 births
Italian psychiatrists
University of Pavia alumni
Academic staff of the University of Pavia